Electoral history of Dick Cheney, who served as the 46th vice president of the United States (2001–2009), 17th United States Secretary of Defense (1989–1993), United States representative from Wyoming (1979–1989, including Minority Whip, 1989), and White House Chief of Staff (1975–1977)

Wyoming's At-large congressional district, 1978 (Republican primary):

Wyoming's At-large congressional district, 1978:

Wyoming's At-large congressional district, 1980:

Wyoming's At-large congressional district, 1982:

Wyoming's At-large congressional district, 1984:

Wyoming's At-large congressional district, 1986:

Wyoming's At-large congressional district, 1988

United States Secretary of Defense, 1989 (Confirmation in the United States Senate):
 Yea – 92
 Nay – 0
 Not voting – 8

2000 Republican National Convention (Vice Presidential tally):
 Dick Cheney – 2,066 (100.00%)

2000 United States presidential election:
 George W. Bush/Dick Cheney (R) – 50,460,110 (47.9%) and 271 electoral votes (30 states carried)
 Al Gore/Joe Lieberman (D) – 51,003,926 (48.4%) and 266 electoral votes (20 states and D.C. carried)
 Abstaining – 1 electoral vote (Washington, D.C. faithless elector)
 Ralph Nader/Winona LaDuke (Green) – 2,883,105 (2.7%)
 Pat Buchanan/Ezola Foster (Reform) – 449,225 (0.4%)
 Harry Browne/Art Olivier (Libertarian) – 384,516 (0.4%)
 Howard Phillips/Curtis Frazier (Constitution) – 98,022 (0.1%)
 John Hagelin/Nat Goldhaber (Natural Law) – 83,702 (0.1%)
 Others – 54,652 (0.1%)

2004 Republican National Convention (Vice Presidential tally):
 Dick Cheney – unanimously

2004 United States presidential election:
 George W. Bush/Dick Cheney (R) (inc.) – 62,040,610 (50.73%) and 286 electoral votes (31 states carried)
 John Kerry/John Edwards (D) – 59,028,444 (48.27%) and 251 electoral votes (19 states and D.C. carried)
 John Edwards (D) – 1 electoral vote (Minnesota faithless elector)
 Ralph Nader/Peter Camejo (I) – 465,650 (0.38%)
 Michael Badnarik/Richard Campagna (Libertarian) – 397,265 (0.32%)
 Michael Peroutka/Chuck Baldwin (Constitution) – 143,630 (0.12%)
 David Cobb/Pat LaMarche (Green) – 119,859 (0.096%)

References

Cheney, Dick
Dick Cheney